Okur is a Turkish given name for males and a surname. Notable people with the surname include:

Mehmet Okur (born 1979), Turkish retired basketball player who played in the National Basketball Association
Şaziye Okur (born 1992), Turkish female weightlifter competing in the Women's 48 kg division

Turkish masculine given names
Turkish-language surnames